Mads Søndergaard Clausen (born 26 December 2002) is a Danish footballer who plays as a midfielder for Danish Superliga club Viborg FF.

Club career

Viborg FF
Søndergaard joined Viborg FF at the age of 12 from NUGF, a club in his hometown Viborg where he started as a 4-year-old. At the age of 16, Søndergaard was rewarded with a youth contract in Viborg and shortly after, began training with the first team.

On 24 June 2020, Søndergaard got his official debut for Viborg in a Danish 1st Division game against Skive IK. Søndergaard ended the 2019-20 season with six appearances; three from the start and three from the bench. As of the beginning of the 2020-21 season, Søndergaard became a permanent part of the first team squad at Viborg and on 17 September 2020, Søndergaard signed a new deal with the club until June 2023, which would see him go on full-time from the summer 2021.

The following 2020-21 season wasn't easy for Søndergaard; first an injury that kept him out from late September to mid-November, followed by a serious knee injury - more precisely a meniscus injury - that cost him an operation and an injury break of 9 months.

Søndergaard played his first match after his serious injury, in January 2022; a friendly match against Hobro IK. Søndergaard finished the 2021-22 season with six appearances in the Danish Superliga.

Personal life
Mads Søndergaard is the son of former Viborg FF-captain Preben Søndergaard.

References

External links
 

2002 births
Living people
Danish men's footballers
Association football midfielders
Viborg FF players
Danish 1st Division players
Danish Superliga players